Cinema Treasures is a website launched in 2000 in the United States documenting theaters both extant and no longer in existence. It was created by Ross Melnick and Patrick Crowley. Melnick co-authored a book by the same name.
The book explores the current use trends among former theatres, whether lesser or well known.

See also
Theatre Historical Society of America

References

External links 
 

Websites about the media
2000 establishments in the United States
Internet properties established in 2000